is a Japanese former cyclist. He competed in the sprint and the 1000m time trial at the 1968 Summer Olympics.

References

External links
 

1948 births
Living people
Japanese male cyclists
Olympic cyclists of Japan
Cyclists at the 1968 Summer Olympics
Sportspeople from Tokyo